Arthur John Lee (born September 30, 1947) is a Canadian politician and lawyer based in British Columbia. He served as a Liberal Party of Canada Member of Parliament (MP) representing Vancouver East from 1974 to 1979, and as the leader of the British Columbia Liberal Party from 1984 to 1987, becoming the first Chinese Canadian to lead a provincial or federal political party.

Background
Art Lee was born in Lethbridge, Alberta. His father ran a business in Edmonton after serving in the Royal Canadian Air Force, and his great-grandfather worked as a translator during the construction of the Canadian Pacific Railway. After graduating from the University of Alberta Faculty of Law in 1972, he was called to the bar in British Columbia in 1973, and joined the law firm of Frank Lew in Vancouver.

As a fourth-generation Chinese Canadian, Art Lee was not fluent in the Chinese language. After becoming MP, he took Cantonese lessons to facilitate communications with Chinese residents in his constituency.

Political career

Federal politics
Lee ran as a candidate of the Liberal Party of Canada in the 1974 federal election, winning the riding of Vancouver East against incumbent New Democratic Party (NDP) candidate Paddy Neale by just 57 votes. He served as parliamentary secretary to the Minister of Consumer and Corporate Affairs from 1975 to 1976, and as parliamentary secretary to the Solicitor General of Canada from 1976 to 1977. In the subsequent 1979 election, he lost the seat to NDP candidate Margaret Mitchell, and again in 1980.

Provincial politics
After Shirley McLoughlin resigned as leader of the British Columbia Liberal Party in 1983, Lee won the leadership election in 1984 against three opponents. At that time, the party had little popular support due to its association with the federal Liberals, and it held no seats in the British Columbia Legislative Assembly. Lee attempted to enter the legislature by running in the Vancouver East by-election on November 8, 1984, but lost to British Columbia New Democratic Party candidate Bob Williams.

In the 1986 provincial election, Lee ran for one of two seats in Vancouver-Little Mountain alongside fellow Liberal candidate Joyce Statton; the seats were won by incumbent Social Credit candidates Grace McCarthy and Doug Mowat. The Liberals were once again shut out of the legislature, but the party won 6.74% of the popular vote, more than double what they had received in the 1983 election. Thereafter Lee announced his resignation as party leader, staying on until Gordon Wilson was acclaimed as the new Liberal leader in October 1987.

Election results

Provincial

Federal

See also
List of electoral firsts in Canada
Chinese Canadians in Greater Vancouver

References

External links

1947 births
Living people
Lawyers in British Columbia
Leaders of the British Columbia Liberal Party
Liberal Party of Canada MPs
Members of the House of Commons of Canada from British Columbia
People from Lethbridge County
British Columbia Liberal Party candidates in British Columbia provincial elections
Canadian politicians of Chinese descent
Politicians from Vancouver
University of Alberta Faculty of Law alumni